Malyon College is a Baptist college located in Brisbane, Queensland. The college is associated with the Queensland Baptists (Australian Baptist Ministries) in Gaythorne, Queensland. It offers degrees through the Australian College of Theology.

History
Malyon College was established in 1904 as the Queensland Baptist College. It became the Baptist Theological College of Queensland (BTCQ) and then the Queensland Baptist College of Ministry (QBCM) before adopting is current name in honour of its founding principal, T. J. Malyon.

References

External links

Australian College of Theology
Baptist seminaries and theological colleges in Australia
Educational institutions established in 1904
1904 establishments in Australia